Nikolsky is a rural locality (a khutor) in Zaluzhenskoye Rural Settlement, Liskinsky District, Voronezh Oblast, Russia. The population was 652 as of 2010. There are 13 streets.

Geography 
Nikolsky is located 13 km southeast of Liski (the district's administrative centre) by road. Zaluzhnoye is the nearest rural locality.

References 

Rural localities in Liskinsky District